Zu Chong-Zhi is also the name of asteroid 1964 VO1; see also 1888 Zu Chong-Zhi.

Tsu Chung-Chi is a relatively small lunar impact crater on the Moon's far side. It lies to the west-southwest of the crater Leonov, and to the northeast of the large walled plain Mendeleev. To the north of Tsu Chung-Chi is the Mare Moscoviense, one of the few maria on the Moon's far side.

This is a bowl-shaped crater formation that is slightly elongated to the northwest. It has undergone some erosion, with a small, cup-shaped crater intruding slightly into the southern rim and several tiny craterlets within the interior. The inner walls are simple slopes down to the interior floor. This crater is otherwise undistinguished.

This feature - one of the about 500 features identified on the photographs of the far side of the Moon made by Luna 3 in 1959 - was named after the Chinese mathematician and astronomer Zu Chongzhi. According to the memoirs of Boris Chertok, who was closely involved with the Luna 3 mission, some fairly complicated politics was involved in picking the name:

Satellite craters
By convention these features are identified on lunar maps by placing the letter on the side of the crater midpoint that is closest to Tsu Chung-Chi.

References

 
 
 
 
 
 
 
 
 
 
 
 

Impact craters on the Moon